The 1996 Rugby League Premiership Trophy was the 22nd end of season Rugby League Premiership competition and the first in the fully professional Super League era. This competition was separate to the Super League Championship awarded to St. Helens, and continued a long tradition in British rugby league of crowning a season Champion and an end of season Premier.

The winners were Wigan.

Semi-finals

Final

See also 
 Super League I

References

Rugby League Premiership